Prunus kuramica is a species of wild almond native to Afghanistan and nearby areas of Pakistan. It is a dense shrub or tree 1 to 5m tall, with purplish-red hypanthia and sepals, and white or pink petals. It prefers to grow in xeric woodlands with Quercus and Juniper species, typically in rocky ravines at 1800 to 2850m above sea level. A genetic study showed that is closely related to Prunus bucharica, P. webbii and P. kotschyi, and a full genetic and morphological analysis shows that its closest relative is Prunus bucharica.

References

kuramica
Flora of Pakistan
Flora of Afghanistan
Plants described in 1960